Peggy Novak was a British actress.

Selected filmography
 Smithy (1933)
 I Adore You (1933)
The Diplomatic Lover (1934)
 Oh No Doctor! (1934)
 Music Hall (1934)
 Flood Tide (1934)
 A Little Bit of Bluff (1935)
 A Real Bloke (1935)
 School for Stars (1935)
 Jimmy Boy (1935)
 Luck of the Turf (1936)
 The Song of the Road (1937)
 South Riding (1938)
 Save a Little Sunshine (1938)
 Stardust (1938)
 The Ware Case (1938)
 Old Mother Riley in Society (1940)
 He Found a Star (1941)

References

External links
 

1907 births
Year of death missing
English film actresses
People from Birkenhead